Michal Jedlička (born 19 September 1973) is a Czech orienteering competitor. He received a bronze medal in the relay at the 2001 World Orienteering Championships with the Czech team.

He received a silver medal in relay at the 2000 European Orienteering Championships in Truskavets.

See also
 List of orienteers
 List of orienteering events

References

External links
 

1973 births
Living people
Czech orienteers
Male orienteers
Foot orienteers
World Orienteering Championships medalists
Competitors at the 2001 World Games